Massimo Casanova (born 31 August 1970, in Bologna) is an Italian politician who was elected as a member of the European Parliament in 2019.

He is the owner of the Papeete Beach disco in Milano Marittima.

References

Living people
1970 births
MEPs for Italy 2019–2024
Lega Nord MEPs
Lega Nord politicians
Politicians from Bologna